Yverdon-les-Bains railway station is a railway station in the municipality of Yverdon-les-Bains, in the Swiss canton of Vaud. It is located at the junction of the standard gauge Fribourg–Yverdon and Jura Foot lines of Swiss Federal Railways and the  gauge Yverdon–Ste-Croix line of Travys.

Services 
 the following services stop at Yverdon-les-Bains:

 Regio:

PRODES EA 2035 
As part of the strategic development program for rail infrastructure (PRODES), the Confederation and SBB are focusing on customer orientation and economical management of resources.

By 2040, nearly two million people will travel by rail every day, 50% more than today. In rail freight, the Confederation also expects traffic to increase by around 45%. The Swiss rail network will have to continue to meet customer needs: interesting connections, punctual trains, affordable tickets. SBB is committed to the sustainable development of public transport and takes on this responsibility vis-à-vis Switzerland.

Predicted service 

 InterCity: 
 IC5: Half-hourly service between Geneva Airport and St. Gallen.
 IC51 (Sister Line): Hourly service between Geneva Airport and Basel SBB.
 RER Vaud: 
 : Half-hourly service between Grandson and Aigle.
 RER Fribourg:
 : Half-hourly service to Avry.
 Travys:
 Regio: Half-hourly service to Ste-Croix.

References

External links 
 
 

Railway stations in the canton of Vaud
Swiss Federal Railways stations